Igor Trofymov (until 1992 Karpak; born 4 August 1960) is an Estonian sailor and coach.

He was born in Pavlograd, Ukraine. In 1982 he graduated from metallurgy academy in Ukraine.

He started his sailing competitions in 1972. In 1981 he won bronze medal at Soviet Union Championships. In 1981 he placed 5th at Kiel Regatta.

Since 1998 he is working as a sailing coach. Students: Deniss Karpak.

In 2004, 2007, 2009, 2011 and 2012 he was named as Best Sailing Coach of Estonia.

His son is sailor Deniss Karpak.

References

Living people
1960 births
Estonian male sailors (sport)
Estonian sports coaches